1996-10-24 Frank Erwin Center, University of Texas, Austin, TX is a live album by Dave Matthews Band, and is the eleventh volume in the band's DMBlive series of download-only concert recordings. (The releases are not given unique album titles.) The album was recorded at the Frank Erwin Center in Austin, Texas, on October 24, 1996. It is notable for a solo acoustic double encore by Matthews of Little Thing and All Along the Watchtower and represents the last time Dave performed Watchtower solo at a full band show.

Track listing

References

Dave Matthews Band live albums
2009 live albums
Self-released albums